Jericho, New Jersey may refer to:
Jericho, Cumberland County, New Jersey
Jericho, Gloucester County, New Jersey